Events from the year 1680 in France.

Incumbents 
Monarch: Louis XIV

Events
 
 
 
 
 
 Chambers of Reunion (French courts under Louis XIV) decide on complete annexation of Alsace.

Births
 

 
 23 February – Jean-Baptiste Le Moyne de Bienville, French colonizer and Governor of Louisiana (d. 1767)
 9 April – Philippe Néricault Destouches, French dramatist (d. 1754)

Deaths
 

 22 February – Catherine Monvoisin, French sorceress (b. c. 1607)
 14 March – René Le Bossu, French critic (b. 1631)
 17 March – François de La Rochefoucauld, French writer (b. 1613)
 23 March – Nicolas Fouquet, French statesman (b. 1615)
 Marie Meurdrac, French chemist and alchemist (b. 1610)

See also

References

1680s in France